Alfandari was a family of eastern rabbis prominent in the 17th and 18th centuries, found in Smyrna, Constantinople, and Jerusalem. The name may be derived from a Spanish locality, perhaps from Alfambra. The following is a list of the chief members of the family:

Aaron ben Moses Alfandari
Elijah Alfandari
Ḥayyim ben Isaac Raphael Alfandari the Younger
Ḥayyim ben Jacob Alfandari the Elder
Isaac Raphael Alfandari
Jacob ben Ḥayyim Alfandari
Solomon Eliezer Alfandari

Members of this family were to be found as of 1906 in Constantinople and in Beirut. A Portuguese family of the name Alphandéry still exists, as of 1906, in Paris and Avignon. In Avignon there was a physician, Moses Alphandéry, in 1506, and a Lyon Alphanderic, in 1558. Compare the names Moses אלפנדריך and Aaron אלפנדארק.

In addition to the persons mentioned above, there is known a Solomon Alfandari (Valencia, 1367), whose son Jacob assisted Samuel Ẓarẓa in tranṣlating the Sefer ha-'Aẓamim of pseudo-ibn Ezra from Arabic into Hebrew. A merchant, Isaac Alfandari, was wrecked in 1529 on the Nubian coast. In Israeli popular culture, the principal family in the 1973 film Daughters, Daughters is named Alfandari.

For a possible explanation of the name, see Steinschneider.

See also 
 Edmond Alphandéry (b. 1943), French politician
 , several people with this name

References 

Jewish families
Sephardi families
Early Acharonim